Egon Wilden (8 December 1894, in Düsseldorf – 7 September 1931, in Ahlen, Westphalia) was a German painter and set-designer.

Life
Wilden began his studies at the Kunstakademie Düsseldorf, but they were interrupted until 1919 by World War I. One of his most important teachers there was Heinrich Nauen, a proponent of Rhenish Expressionism. His work was influenced by that school and other trends of the time. Watercolours and pastels formed a major part of his oeuvre. He received early recognition as a set-designer around the time of the 1919–20 season at the Schauspielhaus Düsseldorf, which developed into one of the most modern theatres in the German-speaking world under the direction of Louise Dumont and Gustav Lindemann. He was later taken on by theatres in Herne, Gera, Hagen, Barmen-Elberfeld and Cologne, producing a total of around two hundred set designs, featuring vivid colours and often vertical emphases, front-facing architectural motifs and perspectives creating several illusory rooms.

He left the theatre behind in 1930 to work as an independent artist, though he did marry the actress Hedwig Sparrer. He moved into a studio in an artists' house in Düsseldorf-Stockum in January 1931 but in the summer of that year his health began to deteriorate. He died soon afterwards whilst staying with friends in Ahlen. His work remained largely unknown until 2005, when his niece donated a large collection of his paintings and drawings to the Förderkreis of the Kunstmuseum Ahlen. Since then his works have been the subject of several exhibitions.

Selected works 
 Flight into Egypt, 1919
 Two figures in a wood, watercolour, 1920
 God's Love, watercolour (set designs for a production of Die Liebe Gottes by Hermine von Boetticher), c.1920
 The Barber of Seville, set design for the Theater Hagen, 1924
 Paul Kemp, portrait in pencil, c. 1925
 Elektra, set design for the Theater Hagen, 1927
 Angelina, set design for the Theater Köln, 1929
 Self-portrait in bow tie, oil on panel, c. 1930, Theaterwissenschaftliche Sammlung Universität zu Köln
 The Martyrdom of St Sebastian
 Pieta
 Lichtflut (literally A Flood of Light)
 Strahlen (literally Radiating)
 Trees in Light
 Loneliness, Aquarell
 Mourning, Aquarell
 Painter in his Studio

Literature 
  Elmar Buck (ed.): Egon Wilden. Maler und Bühnenbildner, 1894–1931. Ausstellungskatalog der Theaterwissenschaftlichen Sammlung der Universität zu Köln, des Theatermuseums Düsseldorf und des Ernst-Osthaus-Museums Hagen, Köln 1994
  Joachim Geil: Egon Wilden. Der Maler und die Bühne. Teiresias-Verlag, Köln 1999, 
  Burkhard Leismann (ed.), Kinga Luchs, Martina Padberg (Redaktion): Egon Wilden. Leben und Werk, 1894–1931. Förderkreis Kunstmuseum Ahlen e.V., Verlag Hachmannedition, Bremen 2009,

References

External links 
  Egon Wilden und Hedwig Sparrer, Foto im Portal kunstmarkt.com
 

20th-century German painters
20th-century German male artists
Set designers
Artists from Düsseldorf
1894 births
1931 deaths